The Mercedes-Benz W128 is a 6-cylinder luxury car produced by Mercedes-Benz from 1958 to 1960 and marketed as the Mercedes-Benz 220 SE.  It was available in sedan, coupé, or cabriolet body styles, and it was the last new model of the "Ponton" range which had design and styling roots beginning in 1953 with the Mercedes-Benz 180 sedan (W120 chassis). It was largely identical to its 220 S predecessor, except for having petrol injection, 'Einspritzung' in German, reflected in the additional E in its 220 SE designation.

The 220 SE featured a unitized body/frame construction and fully independent suspension.  All models were fitted with Mercedes' M127 2.2 L  (2195 cc) straight 6 gasoline engine with aluminum head, overhead camshaft, and Bosch mechanical fuel injection. This was done by intermittent inlet manifold injection (like the 300 d) and meant that the 2.2-liter engine now produced 115 HP. An automatic clutch was available with the column-mounted 4-speed manual transmission.

At the time, the cabriolet was priced similar to Cadillac's top-end Eldorado Biarritz (DM 23,400/$8,091). Nearly every interior surface of the coupé and cabriolet was covered in wood or leather, and matching leather luggage was available. However, power steering, windows, air conditioning, and an automatic transmission were not available. The W128 was succeeded by the "Fintail" series starting with the W111 line.

Production
The W128 sedan was produced from October 1958 to August 1959 and the Coupé and Cabriolet from July 1958 to November 1960.

Later models
The 220 SE model designation lived on for a few more years with the 1959 220 SEb "fin-body" sedans and the 1961 220 SEb coupé and cabriolet (chassis W111).

References

Notes

Bibliography

External links
 mbzponton.org
 oldtimer-doctor.com

W128
W128
Sedans
Limousines
Cars introduced in 1958
1960s cars

it:Mercedes-Benz W180#Mercedes-Benz 220SE (W128)